Testosterone decanoate is an androgen and anabolic steroid and a testosterone ester. It is a component of Sustanon, along with testosterone propionate, testosterone phenylpropionate, and testosterone isocaproate. The medication has not been marketed as a single-drug preparation. Testosterone decanoate has been investigated as a potential long-acting injectable male contraceptive. It has a longer duration of action than testosterone enanthate, but its duration is not as prolonged as that of testosterone undecanoate.

See also 
 List of androgen esters § Testosterone esters

References 

Androgens and anabolic steroids
Androstanes
Decanoate esters
Testosterone esters